Oleksii Novikov (born 11 February 1996) is a Ukrainian professional strongman. He won the 2020 World's Strongest Man competition, becoming the second Ukrainian World's Strongest Man winner after Vasyl Virastyuk who won in 2004. He won two World's Ultimate Strongman competitions in 2021, and the Rogue Invitational and Europe’s Strongest Man in 2022.

Biography
He was born and raised in Kyiv. He is currently a student of Kyiv National University of Trade and Economics.

Career

2016–2019
Novikov won Ukraine's Strongest Man every year from 2016 to 2019. 

In 2018, he had his first breakthrough performance, winning the Arnold Amateur Strongman World Championships. Through this, he qualified for the 2019 Arnold Strongman Classic, where he placed 7th overall. 

In April 2019, he won the Arnold Strongman Classic South America, qualifying for the 2020 Arnold Strongman Classic. He beat Mateusz Kieliszkowski by 0.5 points, making it one of the tightest finishes in a strongman competition since the 2014 World's Strongest Man, where Zydrunas Savickas beat Hafthor Bjornsson by the same amount. In May, Novikov won the Arnold Strongman Classic Africa.

In June, Novikov competed at his first World's Strongest Man contest. In the heats, 4-times World's Strongest Man Brian Shaw won his group. Novikov was in second place, ahead of Trey Mitchell by 7 points. Novikov and Mitchell faced each other in the stone-off, where Mitchell would usurp Novikov for a place in the finals.

In September, Novikov competed in the Arnold Strongman Classic Europe, placing 2nd, and in October he competed at World's Ultimate Strongman, placing 6th.

2020

In March, Novikov competed at the Arnold Strongman Classic, placing 5th, an improvement on 7th the year prior. 

In May, Novikov took part in the first season of the World's Ultimate Strongman Feats of Strength series to set a world record for the Giant Dumbbell for Reps (100 KG). Novikov set the world record at 11 repetitions. 

In November, with the absence of perennial favorite Mateusz Kieliszkowski and defending champion Martins Licis, who did not compete due to injury, Novikov won his first World's Strongest Man title, becoming the second youngest man to win the competition at just 24 years 278 days of age, after Jón Páll Sigmarsson won at 24 years 271 days of age in 1984. In the Max 18-inch Deadlift event, Novikov set a new world record by lifting .

In December, Novikov participated in the first ever annual Shaw Classic, placing 3rd overall.

2021
Novikov won both World's Ultimate Strongman shows that occurred in 2021: the first in Bahrain in March, and the second in Dubai in September. In July, Novikov won the Giants Live Strongman Classic in Royal Albert Hall, London. However, at the 2021 World's Strongest Man, he finished fourth in his heat, failing to qualify for the final. In doing so, he became the first World's Strongest Man reigning champion to compete at the following year's event and fail to qualify for the final since Magnús Ver Magnússon in 1997, nearly a quarter of a century prior. In October, Novikov placed 3rd at the first Rogue Invitational strongman competition.

2022
In March, Novikov placed second at the 2022 Arnold Strongman Classic. He later won Europe’s Strongest Man 2022, despite having limited training accessibility due to partaking in the draft for Ukraine. 

In June, he placed 3rd at World's Strongest Man, despite winning 3 of 6 events in the final. In July, Novikov defended his Giants Live Strongman Classic championship in Royal Albert Hall, London, winning 3 of 5 events. In August, Novikov would place 3rd at the Giants Live World Open, behind Mitchell Hooper and fellow Ukrainian Pavlo Nakonechnyy. 

In August, he placed 4th at the 2022 Shaw Classic, breaking two world records on the first day, with a 1210lb hummer tire max deadlift followed by 8 reps on the 110kg circus dumbbell.

In October, at the Rogue Invitational, Novikov won the Cyr Dumbbell Ladder, and was consistent in the other 5 events to win the competition with one of the biggest prize purses in strongman history.

Personal records

 Giant Dumbbell for Reps –  × 11 (Feats of Strength series, 2020) (World Record)
 Circus Dumbbell for Reps -  × 8  (Shaw Classic 2020) (World Record)
 Giant Dumbbell for Reps –  × 7 (World Record)
 Flintstone Barbell jerk (behind the neck) –  (2022 World's Strongest Man) (World Record)
 Hummer Tire Deadlift –  (World Record)
 Axle Press –  (2021 Giants Live Strongman Classic)
 Log Press for Reps –  × 4
 Double T Squat (equipped) –  (2022 Arnold Strongman Classic)
 Squat (with wraps) – 
 Equipped Deadlift –  (2021 World Deadlift Championships)
 Elephant Bar Deadlift – 
 Atlas Stone for Reps –  × 5

See also
 List of strongmen

References

External links

Living people
Ukrainian strength athletes
Ukrainian sportsmen
1996 births